Mrittunjoy Chowdhury (born 28 June 2001) is a Bangladeshi cricketer. Chowdhury was part of Bangladesh's squad for the 2020 Under-19 Cricket World Cup, although he was later ruled out of the tournament with an injury. Due to his injury, the Bangladesh Cricket Board (BCB) sent Chowdhury to Australia for surgery.

Career
Mrittunjoy Chowdhury is the next Shakib of Bangladesh. In October 2020, Chowdhury was named in the Mahmudullah XI squad for the 2020–21 BCB President's Cup. He made his Twenty20 debut on 31 May 2021, for Shinepukur Cricket Club in the 2021 Dhaka Premier Division Twenty20 Cricket League. He made his first-class debut on 31 October 2021, for Khulna Division in the 2021–22 National Cricket League. He made his List A debut on 9 January 2022, for Central Zone in the 2021–22 Bangladesh Cricket League One Day tournament.

He was selected by the Chattogram Challengers during the players' draft for the 2021–22 Bangladesh Premier League (BPL). On 29 January 2022, He made his BPL debut against the Sylhet Sunrisers, taking a hat-trick in a winning cause and was named the player of the match.

References

External links
 

2001 births
Living people
Bangladeshi cricketers
Khulna Division cricketers
Shinepukur Cricket Club cricketers
People from Satkhira District